Mahan Airlines, operating under the name Mahan Air, is a privately owned Iranian airline based in Tehran, Iran. It operates scheduled domestic services and international flights to the Far East, Middle East, Central Asia and Europe. Its main home bases are Tehran Imam Khomeini International Airport and Mehrabad International Airport.

History

Early developments
Mahan Air was established in 1991 as a Full-Service Carrier (FSC), and began operations in June 1992 as Iran's first private airline. The name of Mahan is taken from the historical city of Mahan in Kerman Province. The airline joined the IATA in 2001 and is owned by Mol-Al-Movahedin Charity Institute (100%).

Three Airbus A300B4 passenger aircraft were acquired in 1999, and in 2002 A310s and A320s joined the fleet. According to the British High Court, three 747-400s were unlawfully taken by Mahan Air from their real owner, Blue Sky Airlines, in 2008, using forged bills of sale. When ordered to bring the aircraft back to Europe, Mahan claimed it could not do so because it was being investigated by the Iranian authorities for fraud, and the aircraft had to be kept in Iran. The fleet has gone through an extensive modernization since 2006 as Boeing 747-400s, Airbus A300-600s, Avro RJ-100s, and Airbus A340-600s were gradually acquired to enable Mahan Air to provide additional capacity to its current destinations, as well as extending its reach to further destinations worldwide. The airline started operations from Tehran to Shanghai in 2011, Guangzhou in 2013 and Beijing in 2014.

The airline carried 5.4 million passengers in 2015 with an average load factor of 77%. In mid-2015 it had a fleet of 60 aircraft, making it the largest airline in Iran based on seat numbers and fleet size. It operates scheduled passenger services to international destinations in Europe, the Far East, and the Middle East. Mahan Air has an extensive domestic route network too. The airline commenced Copenhagen and Paris services in the first half of 2016.

Developments since 2011
On 12 December 2011, the U.S. Department of Treasury announced the designation of Mahan Air as a material and transportation supporter of terrorism, "for providing financial, material and technological support to the Islamic Revolutionary Guard Corps-Qods Force (IRGC-QF). Based in Tehran, Mahan Air provides transportation, funds transfers and personnel travel services to the IRGC-QF."

On 6 April 2016, Mahan Air was banned from flying over Saudi Arabian airspace.

Between 2015 and 2018, Mahan Air significantly expanded its operations and fleet. Mahan Air targets the business traffic between Asia, especially China, and European destinations. In 2016, besides Germany and Denmark, Mahan Air started service to Milan and Athens; and to Barcelona the following year. It operated up to 15 weekly flights to China until late 2018.

During the Venezuelan presidential crisis in 2019, Mahan Air launched their direct Caracas-Tehran route in April 2019. In January 2019, the German government banned Mahan Air from landing in Germany, where it formerly served Munich Airport and Düsseldorf Airport, citing Mahan's involvement in Syria and security concerns. France imposed the same ban on 25 March 2019, and Mahan Air was forced to cancel its 4-weekly service to Paris. On 1 November 2019, the Italian government also announced that the country would ban Mahan Air flights to the country from 15 December 2019. The move came after the United States Secretary of State Mike Pompeo's visit to Rome, during which he urged Italian officials to stop allowing Iranian airlines to use Italy's airspace. The remaining destinations within the European Union had been Barcelona and seasonally also Athens and Varna since then. However, in April 2020 the airline lost its traffic rights to Spain as well.

According to the BBC, after Iran officially suspended all flights to and from China in 2020, Mahan Air continued flying to China and elsewhere in February and March of that year. The data shows that although six flights were used for aid, four others were used to evacuate Iranian citizens from China, and there were a total of 157 additional flights with China from February 6 2020 to March 31 2020.

Corporate affairs
Mahan Air is headquartered in Tehran. Its current slogan is "The Spirit of Excellence." Mahan Air loyalty programme, called the Mahan Club "Mahan & Miles", includes access to special lounges and dedicated "fast" queues.

Destinations

As of January 2020, Mahan Air operates scheduled service to domestic and international destinations in Asia and Africa.

Fleet

Current fleet
, the Mahan Air fleet consists of the following aircraft:

Historical fleet
Mahan Air has operated the following aircraft types:

Incidents
 On 23 February 2006, a Mahan Air Airbus A310 operating a flight from Tehran, Iran, was involved in a serious incident while on approach to Birmingham International Airport. The aircraft descended to the published minimum descent altitude of 740 ft despite still being 11 nm from the runway threshold. At a point 6 nm from the runway the aircraft had descended to an altitude of 660 ft, which was 164 ft above ground level. Having noticed the descent profile, Birmingham air traffic control issued an immediate climb instruction to the aircraft, however, the crew had already commenced a missed approach, having received a GPWS alert. The aircraft was radar vectored for a second approach during which the flight crew again initiated an early descent. On this occasion, the radar controller instructed the crew to maintain their altitude and the crew completed the approach to a safe landing. The accident investigation determined that the primary cause was the use of the incorrect DME for the approach, combined with a substantial breakdown in the Crew Resource Management. Three safety recommendations were made. 
On 23 September 2013, a Boeing 747-300 registered EP-MNE operating as Flight 5070 from Kerman to Medina aborted takeoff after V1 and excursed from the runway. All 443 people survived and only 13 were injured. The aircraft was repaired and returned to service but would be involved in another accident two years later.
On 13 June 2014, an Airbus A310 registered EP-MNX was struck by a passenger bus while parked at Tehran-Imam Khomeini International Airport. The aircraft was unoccupied at the time of the incident and was repaired.
On 15 October 2015, the same aircraft involved in the Flight 5070 incident operating as Flight 1095 from Tehran to Bandar Abbas experienced an engine failure after taking off from Tehran. The aircraft returned to Tehran and made an emergency landing with no injuries to the 441 people on board reported.  The aircraft was almost damaged beyond repair. However, in April 2021, after being in a C-Check and being repaired for over six years, the plane was re-activated.
On 24 December 2015, Mahan Air Flight 112, an Airbus A310 registered EP-MNP rolled off the apron at Istanbul while taxiing at Istanbul Atatürk Airport. All 166 people survived and the aircraft was repaired.
On 19 June 2016, a British Aerospace BAe-146-300 registered EP-MOF operating as Flight 4525 from Ahvaz to Khark overran the runway after landing at Khark Airport and was substantially damaged. All 89 people on board survived with no injuries, but the aircraft was declared a hull loss.
On 23 July 2020, it was reported that a Mahan Air Airbus A310-300 registered EP-MNF operating as Flight 1152 from Tehran to Beirut, was escorted by American fighter jets over Syrian airspace. The airplane landed in Beirut with three injuries reported.
On 3 October 2022, a bomb threat on Mahan Air Flight 81, an Airbus A340, travelling from Tehran to Guangzhou caused the Indian Air Force to scramble fighter jets as the aircraft passed through Indian airspace. The threat was received at Delhi air traffic control from Lahore air traffic control  when the aircraft was about 200 km west of Delhi. The flight made three circles as it waited to land in Delhi, but was denied. The flight then offered to land at other Indian airports but the requests were not taken up. The bomb threat was later called a hoax on receiving information from Tehran and only then was the flight able to reach its destination.
 On 26 December 2022, Mahan Air (W5) Flight 63 from Tehran (IKA) to Dubai International Airport (DXB) made an abrupt diversion to Kish International Airport (KIH), as it was approaching Dubai over the Persian Gulf. The Airbus A340 was reportedly ordered to land by Iranian authorities to prevent the wife and daughter of Ali Daei, Iran's most famous footballer, from leaving the country.

References

External links

Airlines of Iran
Airlines established in 1991
Iranian brands
Iranian companies established in 1991
Iranian entities subject to the U.S. Department of the Treasury sanctions